Whittington, Gloucestershire is a village and rural parish in the county of Gloucestershire in England, United Kingdom.

Location 

Whittington, Gloucestershire is situated some 4 miles south east of Cheltenham, just off the busy A40 road.

History & Amenities 

The village is not large and the properties are spread along the main village roads. Whittington Court is one of the larger properties and was the old manor house. Set near Whittington Court is the parish church dedicated to St. Bartholomew.

The village was mentioned in Domesday. The church is early Norman architecture in origin. It is the site of Roman settlements notably at a field called Wycomb (formerly Wickham).

The Cotswold Hills are situated nearby with Cleeve Hill rising up above the village, the Cotswold's highest point.

The nature reserves of Dowdeswell Reservoir and Wood and Arle Grove lie near Whittington.

References

External links 

Genuki info and links relating to Whittington, Glos
Whittington church history
www.geograph.co.uk : photos of Whittington, Glos and surrounding area

Villages in Gloucestershire